Sir Francis Leicester, 3rd Baronet (1674–1742) of Tabley, Cheshire was a British landowner and politician who sat in the House of Commons from 1715 to 1727.

Leicester was born on 30 July 1674, the eldest surviving son of Sir Robert Leicester, 2nd Baronet, of Tabley and his wife Meriell Watson, daughter of Francis Watson of Church Aston, near Newport, Shropshire. His father died on  7 July 1684 and he succeeded to the baronetcy. He was educated at Eton College from 1686 to 1692 and was admitted at St. John’s College, Cambridge on 6 April 1692. He was also admitted at Middle Temple on 28 November 1694.  Sometime between. 1701 and 1705, he married Frances Thornhill, widow  of Byrom Thornhill of Fixby, Yorkshire and daughter  of Joshua Wilson of Pontefract and Colton, Yorkshire.
 
Leicester was High Sheriff of Cheshire for the year 1705 to 1706.  At the 1715 general election, he was returned as Member of Parliament for Newton by his  friend, Peter Legh of Lyme, who owned the borough. He was returned again at the 1722 general election. Leicester did not stand in 1727 or after.
 
Leicester extended Tabley Old Hall, increasing the servants' quarters, and adding another wing including a new library.

Leicester died on 5 August 1742 and the baronetcy became extinct. He and his wife had one daughter Merriel, who married firstly Fleetwood Legh, with whom she had a daughter and secondly Sir John Byrne of Timogue. in 1728.  Leicester left her his estate worth £10,000 per annum, but his will, required his heirs to change their name to Leicester and to maintain the hall in good order; otherwise they would forfeit the inheritance. The inheritance fell to Merriel’s eldest son by her second marriage who duly changed his name from Byrne to Leicester.  As he could not demolish the old hall, he  built a completely new house about 700 metres away, which is the present Tabley House and the family moved into it in 1767.

References

1674 births
1742 deaths
People educated at Eton College
Alumni of St John's College, Cambridge
British MPs 1715–1722
British MPs 1722–1727
Members of the Parliament of Great Britain for English constituencies
High Sheriffs of Cheshire
Baronets in the Baronetage of England